Victor Derrick Radley (born 14 March 1998) is an England international rugby league footballer who plays as a  for the Sydney Roosters in the NRL. He won back-to-back NRL premierships with the Roosters in 2018 and 2019.

Background
Radley was born in Sydney, New South Wales, Australia and raised in Bronte. He is of English descent through his father Nigel. Victor's middle name 'Derrick' is the name of one of his father's best friends from growing up. Victor was not aware of where his middle name came from, until his mother was asked by the Fox League team, Victor responding that he had no idea.

He played junior rugby union for the Clovelly Eagles and junior rugby league for the Clovelly Crocodiles, before being signed by the Sydney Roosters.

Playing career

Early career
In 2016 and 2017, Radley played for the Sydney Roosters' NYC team. In October 2016, he played in the Roosters' NYC Grand Final win over the Penrith Panthers.

2017
In May, Radley played for the Junior Kangaroos against the Junior Kiwis, before playing for the New South Wales under-20s team against the Queensland under-20s team later that month. 

In round 20 of the 2017 NRL season, he made his NRL debut for the Roosters against the Newcastle Knights. In September, he was named on the interchange bench in the NYC Team of the Year.

2018
In Round 3 against the Newcastle Knights, Radley scored his first NRL career try in the 38-8 win at Sydney Football Stadium. In Round 9 against the Manly Sea Eagles, Radley earned the nickname “Victor the Inflictor” after he pulled off two try saving tackles on Martin Taupau and Dylan Walker as the Roosters held on to walk away with a 22-20 win at Sydney Football Stadium. In August 2018, Radley explained that he would play international football for England if he was asked.

In 2018, Radley made 25 appearances for Eastern Suburbs as the club won their fourth minor premiership in six seasons.  On 30 September, Radley played in Easts 21-6 victory over Melbourne in the 2018 NRL Grand Final. In the post match interview, Radley was speaking with Andrew Johns who asked Radley what he had planned for the celebrations, Radley famously replied "Beers, beers and more beers, I cannot wait".

2019
In round 23, Radley played his 50th NRL game for the Sydney Roosters, scoring a try in their 12-34 win over the St George Illawarra Dragons at Netstrata Jubilee Stadium.  Radley played in the club's 2019 NRL Grand Final victory over Canberra at ANZ Stadium.   

On 7 October, Radley was named at lock for the U23 Junior Australian side.

2020
In round 7 of the 2020 NRL season, Radley was taken from the field with an ACL injury in the Sydney Roosters 26-12 victory over St. George at Bankwest Stadium which later ruled him out for the rest of the year.

2021
On March 10, Radley was suspended for two matches and fined $20,000 by the NRL for an incident which happened in December 2020.  Radley was alleged to have tackled a man at a house party in Byron Bay.  In round 11 of the 2021 NRL season, Radley was sin binned twice and placed on report a further two times in the Sydney Roosters shock 34-16 loss against Brisbane.
Radley was later suspended for five games as a result of the tackles he produced against Brisbane, costing him a potential State of Origin debut.

On 15 June, Radley was removed from a flight that was due to depart the Gold Coast for allegedly being intoxicated.  The following day, Sydney Roosters head coach Trent Robinson spoke to the media and said “It’s not what we want from our players. Just don’t do it. Just act like a man in public and behave yourself. It’s pretty simple".

On 16 August, Radley was suspended for two matches by the NRL after being placed on report during the Sydney Roosters victory over Brisbane in round 22 for dangerous contact.

Radley played a total of 20 games for the Sydney Roosters in the 2021 NRL season including the club's two finals matches.  The Sydney Roosters would be eliminated from the second week of the finals losing to Manly 42-6.

2022
On 19 June, Radley was selected by New South Wales for the game two of the 2022 State of Origin series.
Radley took no part in the match as he was named in the preliminary squad.  In the post match celebrations following New South Wales victory, Radley was caught on CCTV cameras in the dressing room mimicking a sex act on teammate Joseph Suaalii. NRL CEO Andrew Abdo issued Radley for an explanation over the incident.
In the elimination final against South Sydney, Radley was sin binned twice in the Sydney Roosters 30-14 loss which ended their season.

In October he was named in the England squad for the 2021 Rugby League World Cup. On 15 October, Radley made his England debut against Samoa in the 2021 Rugby League World Cup as England won the match 60-6.
Radley played in all five matches for England at the tournament as they reached the semi-finals before losing to Samoa 27-26. 
On 14 November 2022, the Rugby Football League placed Radley under investigation after he was alleged to have been involved in a fight with Leeds player James Bentley at England's team hotel.
In November he was named in the 2021 RLWC Team of the Tournament.

References

External links

Sydney Roosters profile
England profile

1998 births
Living people
Australian rugby league players
Australian people of English descent
England national rugby league team players
Junior Kangaroos players
Rugby league hookers
Rugby league locks
Rugby league second-rows
Rugby league players from Sydney
Sydney Roosters players